Tocho (Tacho) is a Niger–Congo language in the Talodi family spoken in Kordofan, Sudan. It is spoken by approximately 2,700 people in the following villages: Igije, Imanjela, Thodero, Thoge, Tobaredeng, Tocho Goos, Tocho Saraf Jamus, Toderum, Togero, Togiding, Toriya, Torobang, Tothokrek and Turu.

Grammar

Phonology

Consonant Phonemes 
Following is presented the list of Tocho consonant phonemes according to Akaki and Norton (2013:178). In Tocho, plosives and nasals can be pronounced in all 5 places, but nasals are missing a dental representative. Compared to older data (Schadeberg 1981), the flap [ɽ] is mostly merging with the trill [r, rr], but one can also argue that the newer data (Alaki & Norton 2013:178-180) was collected in Khartoum, where Sudanese Arabic (which does not contain a flap (ɽ), but has a trill [r]) is the official language. So the merging can not be confirmed yet and has to be verificated with data in the villages where Tocho is spoken.

Vowel Phonemes

Noun classes 
The Tocho language uses different prefixes to differentiate the numerus of nouns, sorted by noun classes with individual prefix-pairs. Those prefix-pairs consist of mostly all consonant phonemes and the option of none prefix (marked as ø). In most of the classes only the first consonant changes, but in some the difference between singular and plural is also indicated through a change in some of the first vowels, as for example /ʊ ~ ə/ and /a ~ ə/.

Further reading
Alaki, Thomas Kuku & Russell Norton. 2013. Tocho phonology and orthography. In Roger Blench & Thilo Schadeberg (eds), Nuba Mountain Language Studies. Cologne: Rüdiger Köppe. pp.177-194.

References

Severely endangered languages
Talodi languages